"Como Decirte Adiós" (English: "How Do I Tell You Goodbye") is the fifth single from Ricky Martin's album, A Medio Vivir (1995). It was released as a promotional single in the United States on August 6, 1996.

The song reached number seventeen on the Latin Pop Airplay in the United States.

Formats and track listings
US promotional CD single
"Como Decirte Adiós" – 3:00

Charts

References

1996 singles
Ricky Martin songs
Spanish-language songs
Pop ballads
Sony Discos singles
1995 songs
Song recordings produced by K. C. Porter
Songs written by Marco Flores (songwriter)